Consort Yi may refer to:

Consorts with the surname Yi
Queen Yongmok ( 11th century), wife of Jeongjong of Goryeo
Queen Inye (died 1092), second wife of Munjong of Goryeo 
Royal Consort Ingyeong Hyeon-Bi ( 11th century), third wife of Munjong of Goryeo
Royal Consort Injeol Hyeon-Bi (died 1082), fourth wife of Munjong of Goryeo
Royal Consort Jeongsin Hyeon-Bi ( 11th century), first wife of Seonjong of Goryeo
Queen Sasuk ( 1065–1107), second wife of Seonjong of Goryeo
Princess Wonsin ( 11th century), third wife of Seonjong of Goryeo
Queen Gyeonghwa (1079–1109), first wife of Yejong of Goryeo
Queen Sundeok (1094–1118), second wife of Yejong of Goryeo
Queen Sapyeong (died  1174), wife of Gangjong of Goryeo
Queen Hyogong ( 1392), wife of Mokjo of Joseon
Consort Yi (Ming dynasty) (1392–1421), concubine of the Yongle Emperor
Royal Consort Anbin Yi (1622–1693), concubine of Hyojong of Joseon
Royal Noble Consort Yeongbin Yi (1696–1764), concubine of Yeongjo of Joseon
Internal Princess Consort Hanchang (1818–1874), wife of Internal Prince Yeoseong

Consorts with the title Consort Yi
Concubine Yi (Qianlong) (died 1736), concubine of the Qianlong Emperor
Empress Dowager Cixi (1835–1908), concubine of the Xianfeng Emperor

See also
Consort Li (disambiguation)